In mathematics, the Boole polynomials sn(x) are polynomials  given by the generating function

, .

See also

Umbral calculus
Peters polynomials, a generalization of Boole polynomials.

References

Boole, G. (1860/1970), Calculus of finite differences.

 Reprinted by Dover, 2005

Polynomials